William Henry McMaster (May 10, 1877September 14, 1968) was an American Republican politician who served as the tenth Governor of South Dakota, serving from 1921 until 1925. He also served as a member of the United States Senate from South Dakota from 1925 to 1931.

Biography
McMaster was born to Samuel and Sara (Woodsum) McMaster in Ticonic, Iowa, Monona County, Iowa. His family moved to Sioux City, Iowa after the death of his father in 1880; and while growing up, he contributed to the family income by delivering the morning edition of the "Sioux City Journal." McMaster graduated from Sioux City High School and in 1899, he received a B.A. degree from Beloit College in Wisconsin. McMaster served as the head football coach at the University of Wisconsin–Oshkosh, then known as Oshkosh Normal School in 1899.

Career
McMaster moved to Gayville, South Dakota, and entered the banking industry, serving as the cashier of the Bank of Gayville. He was elected Gayville City Treasurer in 1905 and was re-elected in 1907.

He was elected to the South Dakota House of Representatives from Yankton County in 1910. He was then elected to the State Senate in 1912, and was re-elected in 1914.

In 1916, McMaster ran for Lieutenant Governor. He defeated fellow State Senator E. C. Miller and former State Representative T S. Everitt in the Republican primary, and then defeated the Democratic nominee, State Senator Andrew S. Anderson, in the general election with 55% of the vote. He was re-elected in a landslide in 1918, receiving 52% of the vote to Nonpartisan League nominee A. L. Putnam's 27% and Democratic nominee C. C. Siderius's 20%.

In 1920, with Governor Peter Norbeck opting to run for the U.S. Senate rather than seek re-election, McMaster entered the race to succeed him. He won the Republican primary over perennial candidate Richard O. Richards and faced two prominent candidates—Nonpartisan League nominee Mark P. Bates and Democratic nominee William W. Howes—in the general election. Benefiting from the split field, McMaster won the election in a landslide, receiving 56% of the vote. He ran for re-election in 1922, and though he faced a similarly split field, his victory was considerably narrower; he won only 45% of the vote. As Governor, he revised the state tax code, provided state-guaranteed credit, and fought a successful battle against high gasoline taxes.

McMaster declined to seek a third term in 1924 and instead ran for the U.S. Senate. He defeated incumbent Senator Thomas Sterling in the Republican primary and won a 44% plurality in the ensuing general election against Democratic nominee Ulysses Simpson Grant Cherry and several independent candidates. He was narrowly defeated for re-election in 1930 by Governor William J. Bulow. In retirement, he served as an officer of the Dixon National Bank in Illinois.

Death
At the age of 91 years, McMaster died in Yankton and was interred in Oakwood Cemetery, Dixon, Lee County, Illinois US.

Head coaching record

References

External links

National Governors Association

1877 births
1968 deaths
Republican Party governors of South Dakota
Lieutenant Governors of South Dakota
People from Monona County, Iowa
People from Yankton County, South Dakota
Politicians from Sioux City, Iowa
People from Dixon, Illinois
Republican Party South Dakota state senators
Wisconsin–Oshkosh Titans football coaches
Republican Party members of the South Dakota House of Representatives
Beloit College alumni
Republican Party United States senators from South Dakota